, commonly referred to as Woods, is a Japanese football player who playing for Nankatsu SC from 2023.

Career 

On 22 December 2022, Nakabayashi joined to Kantō club part of JRL, Nankatsu SC for upcoming 2023 season as free transfer.

Career statistics 
Updated to the start from 2023 season.

Honours

Club
 Sanfrecce Hiroshima
J2 League: 2008

Yokohama F. Marinos
J1 League: 2019, 2022

References

External links
Profile at Sanfrecce Hiroshima  

1986 births
Living people
Association football people from Kanagawa Prefecture
Japanese footballers
J1 League players
J2 League players
Sagan Tosu players
Sanfrecce Hiroshima players
Fagiano Okayama players
Yokohama F. Marinos players
Nankatsu SC players
Association football goalkeepers